Svaha (Sanskrit: स्वाहा, IAST: Svāhā), also referred to as Manyanti, is the Hindu goddess of sacrifices featured in the Vedas. She is the consort of Agni, and the daughter of either Daksha or Brihaspati, depending on the literary tradition. According to the Brahmavaivarta Purana, she is an aspect of Prakriti (nature), an element without which Agni cannot sustain. 

Additionally, in Hinduism, the Sanskrit lexical item svāhā (romanized Sanskrit transcription; Devanagari: स्वाहा; Chinese: 薩婆訶, sà pó hē, Japanese: sowaka; Tibetan: སྭཱ་ཧཱ་ sw'a h'a; Korean: 사바하, sabaha) is a denouement used at the end of a mantra, which is invoked during yajna fire sacrifices and worship. Svāhā is chanted to offer oblation to the gods. As a feminine noun, svāhā in the Rigveda may also mean oblation (to Agni or Indra). Svaha is also considered to mean an auspicious ending.

Etymology 
Etymologically, the Sanskrit term derives from the root words सू sū- "good" and आहा -āhā "to call".

Legends 
Svaha is personified as a goddess and as the consort of Agni. According to the Brahmavidya Upanishad, Svaha represents the shakti or power that cannot be burned by Agni.  In the Upanishads, Svaha confesses to be enamoured by Agni and wishes to dwell with him. Hence, the deities state that oblations would be offered to Agni while invoking her name during hymns, allowing Svaha to dwell with Agni in perpetuity.

In some versions, she is one of the many divine mothers of Kartikeya (Skanda). She is also the mother of Agneya (Aagneya) — the daughter of Agni. She is considered to be a daughter of Daksha and his consort Prasuti. She is thought to preside over burnt offerings. Her body is said to consist of the four Vedas and her six limbs are considered to be the six Angas of the Vedas.

Story 
In the Mahabharata Vana Parva, Markandeya narrates her story to the Pandavas. Svaha was the daughter of Daksha. She fell in love with the God of Fire, Agni, and was pursuing him. Agni did not notice her. He presided over the sacrificial rituals of the Saptarishis. The deity became highly besotted with the wives of the Saptarishis who were so ravishing that he kept staring at them.

Finally, Agni could not bear the guilt of longing for wives belonging to someone else and he went to the forests to perform penances. Svaha followed him and understood his desire. She took the forms of the wives of the Saptarishis (though she was unable to take the form of Arundhati, wife of Vashishtha) and approached Agni six times, seducing him and throwing the seed of each union into a golden pot, from which Skanda was born.

Literature

Brahmanda Purana 
The Brahmanda Purana mentions the names of the children of Svaha: Pavamāna, Pāvaka, and  Śuci.

Devi Bhagavata Purana 
In the Devi Bhagavata Purana, Narayana offers Narada the procedure to meditate upon Svaha:

Notes

References 

Hindu goddesses
Rigvedic deities
Sanskrit words and phrases
Daughters of Daksha
Hindu mantras
Buddhist mantras
Jain mantras